Kirsten Kraiberg Knudsen is a professor of astrophysics in the department of Space, Earth and Environment at Chalmers University of Technology. Her research concerns galaxy formation and evolution.

She is a member of the Swedish Young Academy  and the International Astronomical Union (IAU)

Early life and education 
Knudsen studied at the University of Copenhagen, and at the University of Leiden where she received a PhD.

Research and career 

Kirsten Knudsen's research focuses particularly on star forming galaxies at cosmological distances. She uses large, modern telescopes such as ALMA, VLT, IRAM PdBI, and VLA to study the properties of redshift z=2-7 (lensed) submillimeter galaxies and quasar host galaxies.

Awards and honours 
 2018 Birger Karlsson Award
 2012 Wallenberg Academy Fellow

References 

Year of birth missing (living people)
Living people
Academic staff of the Chalmers University of Technology
University of Copenhagen alumni
Leiden University alumni
Women astronomers